Carl Wilhelm Adrian Granat (born 26 April 1991), best known as Adrian Granat, is a Swedish former professional boxer who fought at heavyweight.

Boxing career
Having started boxing at age 13, he won gold in the Swedish Championship at 17 in 2009. He won gold again in 2012. Granat turned pro in 2013 and won his first professional bout by knocking out Patryk Kowoll in the second round. He then continued to win fights against Gianluca Sirci, Aziz Baran, Andreas Kapp, and Tomas Mrazek.

On October 31, 2014 Granat fought the hard-hitting, former British and Commonwealth heavyweight title holder, Danny Williams (46-23, with 34 KOs).
Granat won the bout by TKO, 0:48 into the second round.

Professional boxing record

|- style="text-align:center; background:#e3e3e3;"
|style="border-style:none none solid solid; "|
|style="border-style:none none solid solid; "|Result
|style="border-style:none none solid solid; "|Record
|style="border-style:none none solid solid; "|Opponent
|style="border-style:none none solid solid; "|Type
|style="border-style:none none solid solid; "|Round, time
|style="border-style:none none solid solid; "|Date
|style="border-style:none none solid solid; "|Location
|style="border-style:none none solid solid; "|Notes
|- align=center
|17
|Loss
|15–2
|align=left| Otto Wallin
|UD
|12
|21 Apr 2018
|align=left|
|align=left|
|- align=center
|16
|Win
|15–1
|align=left| Irakli Gvenetadze
|TKO
|4 (8) 
|22 Dec 2017
|align=left|
|align=left|
|- align=center
|15
|Loss
|14–1
|align=left| Alexander Dimitrenko
|TKO
|1 (12), 2:07
|18 Mar 2017
|align=left|
|align=left|
|- align=center
|14
|Win
|14–0
|align=left| Franz Rill
|TKO
|6 (12), 1:30
|15 Oct 2016
|align=left|
|align=left|
|- align=center
|13
|Win
|13–0
|align=left| Saul Farah
|TKO
|1 (10), 2:59
|04 Jun 2016
|align=left|
|align=left|
|- align=center
|12
|Win
|12–0
|align=left| Samir Kurtagic
|TKO
|6 (8)
|18 Mar 2016
|align=left|
|align=left|
|- align=center
|11
|Win
|11–0
|align=left| Evgeny Orlov
|TKO
|2 (8)
|19 Feb 2016
|align=left|
|align=left|
|- align=center
|10
|Win
|10–0
|align=left| Michael Sprott
|KO
|1 (8), 2:55
|05 Dec 2015
|align=left|
|align=left|
|- align=center
|9
|Win
|9–0
|align=left| Darnell Wilson
|KO
|2 (8), 2:32
|24 Oct 2015
|align=left|
|align=left|
|- align=center
|8
|Win
|8–0
|align=left| Konstantin Airich
|TKO
|3 (8), 2:44
|28 Aug 2015
|align=left|
|align=left|
|- align=center
|7
|Win
|7–0
|align=left| Haris Radmilovic
|KO
|1 (4), 1:10
|11 Jul 2015
|align=left|
|align=left|
|- align=center
|6
|Win
|6–0
|align=left| Danny Williams
|KO
|2 (6), 0:45
|31 Oct 2014
|align=left|
|align=left|
|- align=center
|5
|Win
|5–0
|align=left| Tomas Mrazek
|UD
|6
|13 Sep 2014
|align=left|
|align=left|
|- align=center
|4
|Win
|4–0
|align=left| Andreas Kapp
|TKO
|1 (6), 2:30
|16 May 2014
|align=left|
|align=left|
|- align=center
|3
|Win
|3–0
|align=left| Aziz Baran
|TKO
|2 (4)
|11 Apr 2014
|align=left|
|align=left|
|- align=center
|2
|Win
|2–0
|align=left| Gianluca Sirci
|KO
|2 (4)
|27 Mar 2014
|align=left|
|align=left|
|- align=center
|1
|Win
|1–0
|align=left| Patryk Kowoll
|TKO
|2 (6), 1:43
|08 Nov 2013
|align=left|
|align=left|
|- align=center

References

1991 births
Living people
Heavyweight boxers
Swedish male boxers
Sportspeople from Malmö
Accountants